Knappa High School is a public high school near Knappa, Oregon, United States. The school is located on Highway 30, 12 miles east of Astoria and 90 miles from Portland, between Svensen and Knappa. The Knappa School District serves the unincorporated communities of Knappa, Svensen, Burnside and Brownsmead.

Knappa High School's first class graduated in 1919.

The Knappa school district has won baseball championship in 2009, 2015, 2016, and in 2017.

Academics
In 2008, 85% of the school's seniors received a high school diploma. Of 47 students, 40 graduated, five dropped out, and two were still in high school in 2009.

External links
 Knappa HS website

References

High schools in Clatsop County, Oregon
Public high schools in Oregon